Herb Snitzer (né Herbert D. Snitzer; November 1932 – December 31, 2022) was an American photographer who photographed jazz musicians in the 1950s and 1960s. He lived in St. Petersburg, Florida and opened his own gallery in 2014. His work has been shown in solo exhibitions at the Florida Museum of Photographic Arts, Museum of Fine Arts (St. Petersburg, Florida) and the William Breman Jewish Heritage & Holocaust Museum.

Snitzer died from complications of Parkinson's disease on December 31, 2022, at the age of 90.

Publications

Books by Snitzer
Living at Summerhill: A Photographic Documentary on A. S. Neill's Pioneering School. MacMillan, 1968. .
Today is for Children: Numbers Can Wait. MacMillan, 1972.
Jazz: A Visual Journey. Notables, 1999.
Glorious Days and Nights: A Jazz Memoir. University Press of Mississippi, 2011.

Books with others
The New York I Know. By Marya Mannes. Lippincott, 1961. Photographs by Snitzer.
Reprise, The Extraordinary Revival of Early Music. With Joel Cohen. Little Brown, 1985.

Solo exhibitions
Faces and Places: One Man Show by Herb Snitzer, Florida Museum of Photographic Arts, Tampa, Florida, 2001
Herb Snitzer: Celebrating Fifty Years in Photography, Museum of Fine Arts (St. Petersburg, Florida), Saint Petersburg, Florida, 2007
A Jazz Memoir: Photography by Herb Snitzer, William Breman Jewish Heritage & Holocaust Museum, Atlanta, Georgia, 2020

Collections
Snitzer's work is held in the following permanent collections:
Minneapolis Institute of Art, Minneapolis, Minnesota: 5 prints (as of 14 January 2023)
Museum of Modern Art, New York: 1 print (as of 14 January 2023)

References

External links
 
 Herb Snitzer TEDx Talk about The Summmerhill School
 Herb Snitzer on NBC
 Herb Snitzer - Image Archive" at ArenaPAL

1932 births
2022 deaths
Jazz photographers
Photographers from Florida
People from St. Petersburg, Florida